Fredrik Oldrup Jensen (born 18 May 1993) is a Norwegian footballer who plays as a midfielder for the Eliteserien side Vålerenga.

Oldrup Jensen made his senior debut on 9 April 2012 against Lillestrøm; they won the game 2–0.

On 25 July 2017 Jensen signed a 4-year contract with Belgium side Zulte Waregem.

On 14 February 2020 Jensen signed a 2-year contract with Norwegian side Vålerenga.

Career statistics

References 

1993 births
Living people
Sportspeople from Skien
Norwegian footballers
Association football midfielders
Odds BK players
Vålerenga Fotball players
Eliteserien players
Norwegian expatriate footballers
S.V. Zulte Waregem players
Belgian Pro League players
Expatriate footballers in Belgium
Norwegian expatriate sportspeople in Belgium
IFK Göteborg players
Allsvenskan players
Expatriate footballers in Sweden
Norwegian expatriate sportspeople in Sweden